Gros Morne is a mountain located in western Newfoundland, near the coastal community of Rocky Harbour in Gros Morne National Park.

See also
 Mountain peaks of Canada

External links

 Tourism information for the Gros Morne area

Mountains of Newfoundland and Labrador